Creedia alleni is a species of sandburrowers found in the Eastern Indian Ocean in Australia.

Etymology
The sandburrower is named in honor of Gerald R. Allen (b. 1942), of the Western Australia Museum in Perth, who was the one who brought this species to Nelson's attention.

References

Hutchins, J.B. and K.N. Smith, 1991. A catalogue of type specimens of fishes in the Western Australian Museum. Rec. West. Aust. Mus. Suppl. 38. 56p

Creediidae
Fish of Australia
Taxa named by Joseph S. Nelson
Fish described in 1983